Sean Jack Robinson (born 2 November 1993) is a South African rugby union player, currently playing with French Pro D2 side Bayonne. His regular position is full-back or winger.

Career

Early career
He represented  between 2009 and 2011 at various youth weeks.

Sharks

Racing 92
On 5 November 2016, Robinson made move to France to sign for Top 14 club Racing 92 as a medical joker during the 2016-17 season.

Bayonne
On 1 June 2017, Robinson signs a permanent contract with Bayonne to compete in the French second division Pro D2 from the 2017-18 season.

References

South African rugby union players
Living people
1993 births
South African people of British descent
Rugby union players from Pretoria
Sharks (Currie Cup) players
Rugby union fullbacks